Executive Order 14032, titled Addressing the Threat From Securities Investments That Finance Certain Companies of the People's Republic of China, was an executive order signed by United States President Joe Biden on June 3, 2021. The order came into effect on August 2, 2021. 

The order expands the scope of the national emergency declared in Executive Order 13959 and prohibits U.S. persons from investing in Chinese companies identified by the U.S. government as having ties to China's military or surveillance industry.

Reactions 
Wang Wenbin, the spokesman for the Ministry of Foreign Affairs of the People's Republic of China, accused the United States of "overextending the concept of national security" and "abusing its national power", and suggested China would retaliate. The Hang Seng Index dropped 1.1% following the announcement of the order.

References 

Executive orders of Joe Biden
United States sanctions
Sanctions against China
2021 in American law
China–United States relations